Horizont may refer to:
 Horizont (camera), a Russian camera
 Horizont (company) (rus.), Belarusian home appliances producer 
 Horizont (newspaper), a German publication owned by Deutscher Fachverlag
 Horizont (radio), a Bulgarian state-owned radio station